|}

The Großer Preis von Berlin, formerly known as the Deutschland-Preis, is a Group 1 flat horse race in Germany open to thoroughbreds aged three years or older. It is run at Hoppegarten over a distance of 2,400 metres (about 1½ miles), and it is scheduled to take place each year in July or August.

History
The event was established in 1888, and it was originally staged at Hoppegarten as the Grosser Preis von Berlin. It was initially contested over 2,000 metres, and was extended to 2,200 metres in 1897. It was transferred to Grunewald and increased to 2,400 metres in 1909. A new distance of 2,600 metres was introduced in 1927.

The race returned to Hoppegarten in 1934, and it was renamed the Grosser Preis der Reichshauptstadt in 1937. From this point it was run over 2,400 metres, and it reverted to 2,600 metres in 1943.

The event switched to Düsseldorf and was renamed the Grosser Preis von Nordrhein-Westfalen in 1947. That year's running was over 2,400 metres, and it returned to 2,600 metres in 1948. Its current period over 2,400 metres began in 1965.

The present race grading system was introduced in Germany in 1972, and the Grosser Preis von Nordrhein-Westfalen was classed at Group 1 level. Its original title, the Grosser Preis von Berlin, was restored in 1977.

The event became known as the Deutschland-Preis in 1996. It was held at Hamburg and merged with the Hansa-Preis in 2010. It returned to Hoppegarten as the Grosser Preis von Berlin in 2011.

Records
Most successful horse (3 wins):
 Ticino – 1942, 1943, 1944
 Mercurius – 1963, 1964, 1965

Leading jockey (8 wins):
 Otto Schmidt – Ossian (1921), Augias (1923, 1924), Elritzling (1939), Ticino (1942, 1943, 1944), Niederländer (1950)

Leading trainer (10 wins):
 George Arnull – Weissdorn (1925), Mah Jong (1927), Oleander (1928, 1929), Alba (1930), Wolkenflug (1932), Blinzen (1934), Sturmvogel (1935, 1936), Schwarzgold (1940)
 (note: the trainers of some of the early winners are unknown)

Leading owner (22 wins):
 Gestüt Schlenderhan – Dorn (1892), Signor (1903), For Ever (1909), Dolomit (1912), Majestic (1913), Wallenstein (1922), Weissdorn (1925), Mah Jong (1927), Oleander (1928, 1929), Alba (1930), Wolkenflug (1932), Blinzen (1934), Sturmvogel (1935, 1936), Schwarzgold (1940), Agio (1958), Alpenkönig (1970), Lombard (1971, 1972), Arratos (1973), Adlerflug (2008)

Winners since 1970

 Carroll House finished first in 1988, but he was relegated to third place following a stewards' inquiry.

Earlier winners

 1888: Durchgänger
 1889: Freimaurer
 1890: Dalberg
 1891: Hawk
 1892: Dorn
 1893: Hardenberg
 1894: Ausmärker
 1895: Hannibal
 1896: Rondinelli
 1897: Tokio
 1898: Magister / Sperber's Bruder *
 1899: Namouna
 1900: Xamete
 1901: Tuki
 1902: Slanderer
 1903: Signor
 1904: Pathos
 1905: Slaby
 1906: Festino
 1907: Fels
 1908: Horizont
 1909: For Ever
 1910: Fervor
 1911: Icy Wind
 1912: Dolomit
 1913: Majestic
 1914: Orelio
 1915: no race
 1916: Anschluss
 1917: Landgraf
 1918: Traum
 1919: Eckstein
 1920: Herold
 1921: Ossian
 1922: Wallenstein
 1923: Augias
 1924: Augias
 1925: Weissdorn
 1926: Ferro
 1927: Mah Jong
 1928: Oleander
 1929: Oleander
 1930: Alba
 1931: Sichel
 1932: Wolkenflug
 1933: Alchimist
 1934: Blinzen
 1935: Sturmvogel
 1936: Sturmvogel
 1937: Corrida
 1938: Antonym
 1939: Elritzling
 1940: Schwarzgold
 1941: Niccolo dell'Arca
 1942: Ticino
 1943: Ticino
 1944: Ticino
 1945–46: no race
 1947: Glockenton
 1948: Solo
 1949: Nebelwerfer
 1950: Niederländer
 1951: Grande
 1952: Mangon
 1953: Tasmin
 1954: Mangon
 1955: Masetto
 1956: Gombar
 1957: Mogul
 1958: Agio
 1959: Waldcanter
 1960: Wicht
 1961: Windbruch
 1962: Windbruch
 1963: Mercurius
 1964: Mercurius
 1965: Mercurius
 1966: Kronzeuge
 1967: Norfolk
 1968: Luciano
 1969: Cortez

* The 1898 race was a dead-heat and has joint winners.

See also
 List of German flat horse races

References
 Racing Post:
 galopp-sieger.de – Grosser Preis von Berlin.
 horseracingintfed.com – International Federation of Horseracing Authorities – Grosser Preis von Berlin (2018).
 pedigreequery.com – Grosser Preis von Berlin – Hoppegarten.
 tbheritage.com – Deutschlandpreis.

Horse races in Germany
Open middle distance horse races
Recurring sporting events established in 1888